Glacial Lake Columbia was the lake formed on the ice-dammed Columbia River behind the Okanogan lobe of the Cordilleran Ice Sheet when the lobe covered  of the Waterville Plateau west of Grand Coulee in central Washington state during the Wisconsin glaciation. Lake Columbia was a substantially larger version of the modern-day lake behind the Grand Coulee Dam. Lake Columbia's overflow –  the diverted Columbia River – drained first through Foster Coulee, and as the ice dam grew, through first Moses Coulee, and finally, the Grand Coulee.

Glacial Lake Missoula
Over 2000 years the ice dam periodically failed, releasing approximately 40 high-volume Missoula Floods of water down the Columbia River drainage, passing through glacial Lake Columbia. The largest flood is estimated to be the initial flood at 2,500 km3 (600 mi3), with subsequent floods occurring at roughly 20 to 80 year intervals. The erosion from the floods created the Grand Coulee as well as the Dry Falls, Palouse Falls, and the Channeled Scablands features of eastern Washington state.

Flood deposits
Flood beds on the Sanpoil arm of glacial Lake Columbia show episodic flood deposits as well as deposit grading and rhythmical repetition. Since Glacial Lake Columbia remained filled between Missoula floods, annual deposits (varves) can be observed between the Missoula flood deposits, they help to establish the periodicity of these major floods. The flood deposits can be distinguished from annually-deposited varves by both their thickness and the presence of materials foreign to the immediate drainage. Atwater reports from 35 to 55 annual varves between flood deposits in Lake Columbia, supporting a period of 35 to 55 years between ice dam failures.

References

Columbia
Columbia
Geology of Washington (state)
Columbia